Anthony Nation (born 15 July 1963) is an Irish retired Gaelic footballer. His league and championship career with the Cork senior team lasted nine years from 1984 to 1992.

Career

Nation first played competitive Gaelic football at juvenile and underage levels with Nemo Rangers. After progressing onto the club's senior team, he enjoyed a hugely successful era and won All-Ireland medals in 1984, 1989 and 1994. Nation also won four Munster medals and four county senior championship medals.

Nation made his debut on the inter-county scene at the age of twenty when he was selected for the Cork minor team. He enjoyed two championship seasons with the under-21 team, culminating with the winning of an All-Ireland medal in 1984. By this stage he had also joined the Cork senior team, making his debut during the 1984 championship. Over the course of the next eight years, Nation won two All-Ireland medals as part of Cork's back-to-back successes in 1989 and 1990. He also won four successive Munster medals and one National Football League medal. He was selected for Cork for the last time in May 1992.

After being selected on the Munster inter-provincial team for the first time in 1991, Nation was an unused substitute throughout the championship and ended his career without a Railway Cup medal.

Honours

Nemo Rangers
All-Ireland Senior Club Football Championship: 1984, 1989, 1994, 2003
Munster Senior Club Football Championship: 1983, 1987, 1988, 1993
Cork Senior Football Championship: 1983, 1987, 1988, 1993

Cork
All-Ireland Senior Football Championship (2): 1989, 1990
Munster Senior Football Championship (4): 1987, 1988 (c), 1989, 1990
National Football League (1): 1988-89
All-Ireland Under-21 Football Championship (1): 1984
Munster Under-21 Football Championship (1): 1984

References

1963 births
Living people
Nemo Rangers Gaelic footballers
Cork inter-county Gaelic footballers
Munster inter-provincial Gaelic footballers
Winners of one All-Ireland medal (Gaelic football)